Shrine of St. Sebastian is a church in the town of Papanasam in the Thanjavur district of Tamil Nadu, India. It was constructed as a mud church in about 1870 by Fr. Abraham, the parish priest of Thiruvaiyaru. It was renovated by Abraham's successor Gabriel Playoust and consecrated on 20 January 1894. The church is known for the car festival during Easter. The church is a part of the diocese of Kumbakonam. It was bifurcated from the parish of Ayyampettai. Rev. Fr. Cyrian Kappen was the first parish priest. It started functioning as an independent parish from 1933 February 11 onwards.

See also
 Christianity in India
 Christianity in Tamil Nadu
 Roman Catholic Marian churches
 Roman Catholicism in India
 Shrines to the Virgin Mary
 Our Lady of Good Health
 Poondi Matha Basilica(Our Lady of Lourdes Basilica, Poondi), Tamil Nadu, India
 Our Lady of Snows Basilica, Tuticorin, Tamil Nadu, India.
 Kamanayakkanpatti Church of Our Lady of Assumption (பரலோக மாதா திருத்தலம்)
 Our Lady of Snow Kallikulam (Our Lady of Snow Church, Kallikulam), Tamil Nadu, India.

Gallery

References

External links
 

Churches in Thanjavur district
Roman Catholic churches in Tamil Nadu
Roman Catholic shrines in India